Desfile deportivo ("Sports Parade") is a 1936 Mexican film. It was directed by 
Fernando de Fuentes.

External links
 

1936 films
1930s Spanish-language films
Films directed by Fernando de Fuentes
Mexican black-and-white films
Mexican musical films
1936 musical films
1930s Mexican films